PLAF may refer to:

 Phil Lesh and Friends 
 Pluggable look and feel in Java Applications
 People's Liberation Armed Forces of South Vietnam—Viet Cong's army